Hula Dog is a chain of restaurants based in the U.S. state of Hawaii, specializing in a unique type of hot dog, known as a Puka or Hula Dog, which comprises a tube-shaped bun, lacking the opening found on the top of regular buns, filled with a variety of different flavors of sauces and relishes of the customer's choice, and a hot dog that is inserted into the circular opening at the end of the bun.

History

Hula Dog was founded in 2000 by Rick and Dominique Quinette under the name Puka Dog. Dominique, a Swiss immigrant, originally pursued a career in art, which did not turn out to be the success she had hoped. To boost sales, she sold hot dogs to passersby to attract them into her gallery. Eventually, she realized that the hot dogs sold more that her artwork did, so she decided to abandon her art business and open a hot dog stand on Kauai, which was an immediate success.

The stand was relocated into a permanent store in a local shopping center. In 2007, a location was opened in the Waikiki section of Oahu. Eventually, Dominique and Rick decided to divorce, which resulted in Rick getting the two original stores on Kauai and the Puka Dog Brand, and Dominique getting the three stores on Oahu and the company's manufacturing division, but she was forced to give her stores a new name, thus all Oahu Puka Dogs were renamed Hula Dog. Despite this, both Puka and Hula Dog still share the same logo, marketing, and food style. Hula Dog has also franchised out locations in Southern California and Maui.

References

External links
Hula Dog
Puka Dog

Restaurant chains in the United States
Restaurants established in 2000
2000 establishments in Hawaii
Restaurants in Hawaii